Pseudochelatococcus contaminans is a bacterium from the genus of Pseudochelatococcus, which has been isolated from coolant from a metal working emulsion in Germany.

References

Beijerinckiaceae
Bacteria described in 2015